The Dressel Family (Spanish: La familia Dressel) is a 1935 Mexican film. It was directed by Fernando de Fuentes.

External links
 

1935 films
1930s Spanish-language films
Films directed by Fernando de Fuentes
Mexican black-and-white films
Mexican drama films
1935 drama films
1930s Mexican films